They Met in the Dark is a 1943 British comedy thriller film directed by Karel Lamač and starring James Mason, Joyce Howard and Edward Rigby. The screenplay concerns a cashiered Royal Naval officer and a young woman who join forces to solve a murder and hunt down a German spy ring. The film features a single song sung by Phyllis Stanley, "Toddle Along" (Ben Frankel, Moira Heath). The film is very loosely based on the 1941 novel The Vanishing Corpse by Anthony Gilbert.

It was shot at Teddington Studios in London. The film's sets were designed by the art director Norman G. Arnold.

Plot

Commander R. F. Heritage is dismissed from the Royal Navy during the Second World War after being found guilty of losing some top secret documents.

He revisits his places of the previous few days - mainly involving a string of women.

He starts with Mary, a manicurist, in Blackpool. They originally meet in the Hotel Monopole. She has something to impart but then arranges to reconvene in the Bell & Dragon public house outside town. She’s not there and he is sent to a remote cottage up the road.

Meanwhile a young Canadian woman, Miss Verity, arrives at the cottage and finds Mary dead, clutching a note with the words "Child's Theatrical Agency". She barricades the door when Heritage knocks and he leaves. She has seen his face and, when he comes back the next day, she takes the bus to Blackpool and reports the murder to the police. Heritage follows her to the police station. They return to the cottage with the police, but the body is missing. The police threaten to charge Miss Verity with filing a false police report.

Both head to Child's Theatrical Agency in London and from there to the BBC. Heritage brings a different woman, a sophisticated singer, who is coming for an audition. He then wanders off, looking for something. The Canadian woman follows him.

On the train north to Liverpool - where Child has a dance academy - she doesn’t realise she is being interrogated by enemy agents. The female agent tries to have her shot in the dark as they go through a tunnel but manages to steal Miss Verity’s handbag. Heritage rescues her at the barrier when she tries to leave without a ticket.

Meanwhile, Child and his hypnotist - the Great Riccardo - also arrive in Liverpool and hypnotise a Royal Navy officer (Petty Officer Grant) into giving away some secret plans regarding HMS Dandelion, commanded by Lippinscott. They want to hypnotise Miss Verity to see what she knows.

In a bar, Heritage's former batman Mansel starts a fight to cause a diversion. Heritage then rescues Miss Verity from the hypnotist.

In the bar Carter sends a woman (Bobby) to chat with Commander Lippinscott. As they sit,  the harmonica player sends a coded message (hidden in the notes of the music).

Lippinscott and Heritage eventually get together and it appears both are pawns in a bigger game to trap the traitors.

In the morning Bobby leaves in a car with Lippinscott,  The spies go into their hotel bedroom.

Miss Verity tails one of the spies to the countryside by hiding in the back of his car. She in turn is trailed by Mansel and the police. Here the Great Riccardo is trying to dispose of the body of the manicurist hidden inside his garden scarecrow by burning and burying it.

Back in the hotel, experts in disguise decode the musical notation played by the harmonica player proving the sinister plot. Carter and Dr Benson then do a magic act. They pickpocket the message from Lippinscott during the act but do not realise the message in his pocket is blank. Heritage gets on stage as a volunteer and exposes the whole scam, explaining that the room is surrounded by police. Heritage and Miss Verity kiss and she is at a loss what to say further.

Cast
 James Mason as Richard Francis Heritage  
 Joyce Howard as Laura Verity  
 Tom Walls as Christopher Child  
 Phyllis Stanley as Lily Bernard  
 Edward Rigby as Mansel  
 Ronald Ward as Carter  
 David Farrar as Commander Lippinscott  
 Karel Stepanek as Riccardo  
 Betty Warren as Fay
 Patricia Medina as Mary, the manicurist
 Walter Crisham as Charlie  
 George Robey as Pawnbroker  
 Ronald Chesney as Max, Mouth Harmonica Player  
 Peggy Dexter as Bobby  
 Finlay Currie as Merchant Captain  
 Brefni O'Rorke as Detective Inspector Burrows
 Leonard Sharp as Bus Conductor
 Terence de Marney as Code Expert 
 Anthony Dawson as 2nd Code Expert

Critical reception
Radio Times noted "an old-fashioned, run-of-the-mill and unlikely espionage thriller-come-romance, it was topical during the Second World War years, but is rather unrewarding now"; while Britmovie wrote, "there are capable performances from all involved but it’s Tom Walls, the urbane Aldwych farceur, who steals the limelight when cast against type as a charming villain."

References

External links

1943 films
1940s spy thriller films
British spy thriller films
Films directed by Karel Lamač
Films scored by Benjamin Frankel
Films with screenplays by Anatole de Grunwald
British black-and-white films
Films shot at Teddington Studios
Films based on British novels
Films set in Blackpool
Films set in Liverpool
1940s English-language films
1940s British films